First Lady of Sri Lanka refers to the wife of the president of Sri Lanka. To date, there have been eight women who have served in the role. The current First Lady of Sri Lanka is Professor Maithree Wickremesinghe, wife of President Ranil Wickremasinghe, who has held the position since 20 July 2022. There have been no first gentlemen of Sri Lanka to date, since former President Chandrika Kumaratunga, the country's only female head of state, was a widow while in office.

In recent years the holders of the title have been formally or informally referred to by the title First Lady or First Lady of Sri Lanka, though there are no provisions for such in the constitution.

Origins
The office of the president of Sri Lanka was created in 1972 when Sri Lanka became a republic. William Gopallawa, who was the governor-general of Ceylon at the time, became the country's inaugural president. His wife, Seelawathie Gopallawa, became the first wife of a president of Sri Lanka. When J. R. Jayewardene became the next president, his wife was known as Lady Elina Jayewardene during and after his presidency. During the presidency of Ranasinghe Premadasa, his wife Hema Premadasa took on a very viable role and became a public figure unlike before.

Chandrika Kumaratunga who was president from 1994 to 2005 was a widow as her husband, film star Vijaya Kumaratunga, was assassinated in 1987. When Mahinda Rajapaksa became president, his wife Shiranthi Rajapaksa took a higher profile role, using the title of first lady and becoming a public figure during her husband's presidency, with her own naval aide and staff funded by the Presidential Secretariat.

List

See also
 President of Sri Lanka

References

First ladies and gentlemen of Sri Lanka
Sri Lanka